Happy Landing may refer to:
 "Happy Landing" (song), a 1962 song by The Miracles
 Happy Landing (1934 film), an American action film
 Happy Landing (1938 film), a film directed by Roy Del Ruth
 Happy Landing, Ontario, a community in French River, Ontario